The 2012 Pan American Cycling Championships took place in Mar del Plata, Argentina on March 3–11, 2012.

Medal summary

Road

Men

Women

Track

Men

Women

Medal table

References

Americas
Americas
Cycling
Pan American Road and Track Championships
International cycle races hosted by Argentina